John Beck (22 January 1883–13 January 1962) was a New Zealand public servant and child welfare reformer. He was born in Kirkcudbright, Kirkcudbrightshire, Scotland on 22 January 1883.

References

1883 births
1962 deaths
New Zealand public servants
Scottish emigrants to New Zealand